The General Law of Ecological Equilibrium and Environmental Protection (Ley General del Equilibrio Ecológico y la Protección al Ambiente, or LGEEPA in Spanish) is an important piece of Mexican environmental protection legislation passed in March 1988 that defines the framework for all environmental law in Mexico.

External links
 Full text of LGEEPA at CONANP, Mexico's National Park service (Spanish)
 LGEEPA at Mexicolaws.com

1988 in the environment
Environmental law in Mexico